Events from the year 1559 in France

Incumbents
 Monarch – Henry II (until July 10), then Francis II

Events
The Ancient Diocese of Saint-Omer established.

Births

Full date missing
Catherine de Bourbon (died 1604)
Jacques d'Amboise, surgeon (died 1606)
Isaac Casaubon, scholar and philologist (died 1614)

Deaths
 
10 July – Henry II of France (born 1519)

Full date missing
Martin du Bellay, nobleman (born 1495)
Jacquet of Mantua, composer (born 1483)
Nicolas Denisot, poet and painter (born 1515)
Pierre Doré, theologian (born c.1500)
Antoine Le Maçon, translator (born c.1500)
Antoine Sanguin, clergyman (born 1493)
Anne du Bourg, magistrate (born 1521)

See also

References

1550s in France